The 46th edition of the annual Clásico RCN was held from October 15 to October 22, 2006, in Colombia. The stage race with an UCI rate of 2.3 started in Buenaventura and finished in Cali. RCN stands for "Radio Cadena Nacional" – one of the oldest and largest radio networks in the nation.

Stages

2006-10-15: Buenaventura – Cali (123 km)

2006-10-16: Cali – Buga (116 km)

2006-10-17: Tuluá – Villamaría (188 km)

2006-10-18: Manizales – Sabaneta (180 km)

2006-10-19: Itagüí – Pereira (196.9 km)

2006-10-20: Pereira – Armenia (44.8 km)

2006-10-21: Calarcá – Ibagué (156.4 km)

2006-10-22: Espinal – Bogotá (157.7 km)

Final classification

Teams 

Lotería de Boyacá — Coordinadora
 Director Deportivo: José Alfonso "El Pollo" López

EPM — Orbitel
 Director Técnico: José Raúl Mesa

Colombia es Pasión — Coldeportes
 Director Deportivo: Jairo Monroy Gutiérrez

Secretaría de Hacienda — Indeportes Boyacá — Alcaldía de Paipa
 Director Deportivo: Ángel Camargo

Www.Paginascolombianas.Com
 Director Deportivo: Roberto Augusto Sánchez

Aguardiente Antioqueño — Idea
 Director Deportivo: Héctor Castaño

Frutidelicias Frugos del Valle
 Director Deportivo: William Palacio

Coordinadora — Lotería de Boyacá
 Director Deportivo: José Alfonso "El Pollo" López

Orbitel — EPM
 Director Deportivo: Carlos Jaramillo

Bogotá Sin Indifferencia — IDRD — Canapro
 Director Deportivo: Oliverio Cárdenas

Frutidelicias Primacol
 Director Deportivo: Gustavo Cardona

Tolima Solidario — Lotería del Tolima
 Director Deportivo: Danilo Alvis

Caldas Actitud Campeona 2008
 Director Deportivo: John Jairo Narváez

Alcaldía de Ibagué — Tolima Solidario
 Director Deportivo: Carlos Enrique "Ramillete" Pérez

GW Bicycletas Shimano
 Director Deportivo: Luis Alfonso Cely

Postal Express — Químicos y Curtidores San Benito
 Director Deportivo: Marco Tulio Bustamante

Club Cicloases Cundinamarca
 Director Deportivo: Leonidas Herrera

Mixto
 Director Deportivo: John Jairo Rivera

See also 
 2006 Vuelta a Colombia

References 
 Clásico RCN 2006

Clásico RCN
Clasico RCN
Clasico RCN